Kathryna Yu-Pimentel (born Ma. Anna Kathryna de Guzman Yu) is the President of PDP Cares.

Early life and education
Ma. Anna Kathryna de Guzman Yu was born on October 7, 1982 in Manila, Philippines, of Filipino and Chinese descent, to Benjamin C. Yu Jr. and Imelda de Guzman. She attended Jubilee Christian Academy from grade school through high school and earned her Bachelor of Arts in Humanities with professional certificate in Management from the University of Asia and the Pacific, where she was a president of the Student Executive Board from 2002 to 2003. She is also a culinary awardee in the 2000 Asian Food Festival, where she represented Luzon and competed at the World Trade Center Metro Manila among Visayan and Mindanaon representatives.

Career
A chef by profession, she used to manage her own restaurant and catering business. She also used to teach Culinary 101 at Asia Pacific College. By July 2016, she is the managing director of Pimentel Salomon Baltao-Basilio Law Office. She is the President and 1st Nominee of PDP Cares Partylist. One of the 8-Point Program of Government of PDP Cares Partylist is Women and Children Rights which she advocates. In 2019, she opened a franchise of the Michelin-starred Tiong Bahru Hainanese Boneless Chicken Rice and in 2023, has opened its 6th branch. In March 2023, she launched her latest business venture, Alpina Lounge and Wellness, a wellness spa in Uptown Bonifacio, Taguig City.

Personal life
In May 2013, she met her husband Koko Pimentel. They married in October 2018.

She gave birth to a daughter named Ma. Kathryn Helena Yu-Pimentel on March 29, 2020. As an advocate of breastfeeding, she exclusively breastfed Helena for one and a half years.

References

1982 births
Living people
21st-century Filipino politicians
Filipino chefs
Filipino people of Chinese descent
Politicians from Metro Manila
University of Asia and the Pacific alumni